Copestylum barei, the violet bromeliad fly, is a species of syrphid fly in the family Syrphidae.

Distribution
Western North America.

References

External links

 

Eristalinae
Diptera of North America
Hoverflies of North America
Articles created by Qbugbot
Insects described in 1925